Steeg may refer to:

Steeg (surname)
Steeg, Tyrol, a municipality in Tyrol, Austria
De Steeg, a village in the municipality of Rheden, Netherlands